Siebenmann is a surname. Notable people with the name include:

 Friedrich Siebenmann (otolaryngologist) (1852–1928), Swiss otolaryngologist
 Friedrich Siebenmann (trade unionist) (1851–1901), Swiss trade unionist
 Laurent C. Siebenmann (born 1939), Canadian Mathematician

See also
 Kirby–Siebenmann class, in mathematics